Košarkaški klub Radnički, commonly referred to as KK Radnički Kragujevac, was a men's professional basketball club, based in Kragujevac, Serbia and Montenegro.

History 
Established in 1950, the club merged with Zastava Kragujevac into Radnički Zastava in 2004. The multiple clubs have bared their name and tradition, such as the club who played in the ABA League, or the current BLS member.

Home arena

Radnički used to play their home games at the Jezero Hall. The hall is located in the Kragujevac and was built in 1978. It has a seating capacity of 5,320 seats.

Players

Coaches

 Vojislav Vezović (1974–1976)
 Strahinja Alagić
 Miroslav Nikolić (1993–1994) 
 Velislav Vesković (1994–1995)
 Petar Rodić (1996–1997)
 Miroslav Tomović (2002–2004)

References

KK Radnički Kragujevac (1950–2004)
Radnički Kragujevac
Radnički Kragujevac
Radnički Kragujevac
Radnički Kragujevac
Radnički Kragujevac
Radnički Kragujevac
2004 disestablishments in Serbia